HRO may refer to:

 Boone County Airport (Arkansas), in Harrison, Arkansas, United States
 Harassment Restraining Order
 Haroi language, spoken in Vietnam
 Harold Wood railway station in London
 Harvard Radcliffe Orchestra in Cambridge, Massachusetts, United States
 High reliability organization
 Holme Roberts & Owen, an American law firm
 National HRO, a communications receiver

See also
 WHRO (disambiguation)